Amadi Union is a union parishad of Koyra Upazila of Khulna District, in Khulna Division, Bangladesh.

Geography
Chandakhali union is bounded on the north by Amadi union, Koyra river on the south, Maheshwarpur union on the east and Kaptakhms river on the west.

River
Koyra River on the southern border of Amadi union, Kapotakhma River to the west and Shivasa River to the east.

Wards
There are 3 wards in the Amadi Union.
 Jagir mahal
 Amadi
 Ballyadanga
 Vanderpool
 Patnikhali
 Channirchalk
 Harinagar
 Mosjidkur 
 Nakasa

References

Unions of Koyra Upazila
Populated places in Khulna Division
Populated places in Khulna District